Hunter-Killer is an unofficial project name based upon an Aviation Week & Space Technology article. The U.S. Air Force's Hunter-Killer program was a tactical unmanned combat air vehicles (UCAV) procurement program. The General Atomics MQ-9 Reaper, a variant of the MQ-1 Predator won the project and was deployed in Afghanistan.

History
This is the U.S. Air Force program for which several companies have developed vehicles.

Although the J-UCAS concept is a long way from the early idea of a "reusable cruise missile", that notion is apparently alive and well.

Lockheed Martin Minion 
In September 2003, an announcement was made that Lockheed Martin's "Skunk Works" was developing a stealthy air-launched UCAV named "Minion". It could also be used as a decoy, though it would need to have radar-enhancement payload as it is described as extremely stealthy.

Range is given as up to 1,000 nautical miles (1,850 kilometers). Two would be carried into combat by a single strike fighter such as a Lockheed Martin F-22 Raptor, with one under each wing, and launched from standoff distances to attack heavily defended targets. In practice, two strike fighters are expected to be used, launching four Minions, with the pilot of one aircraft watching out for threats while the other directs the UCAVs over a line-of-sight communications link. After the mission, the Minions would return to base and land conventionally on retractable landing gear.

A vague picture released with the announcement showed the Minion to have a certain broad resemblance to various air-launched cruise missiles, such as the Anglo-French Matra-BAe Dynamics APACHE / Storm Shadow or the US AGM-158A Joint Air to Surface Standoff Missile (JASSM), which is also built by Lockheed Martin and may have some degree of commonality with the Minion. The picture showed the Minion to have a spikelike, square-sided fuselage, with pop-out wings and twin tailfins, with the engine inlet just forward of the tailfins and the exhaust just behind the tailfins. Both the intake and the exhaust are shielded by triangular covers.

Despite the stealthiness of the Minion, Lockheed Martin is designing it for low cost, to be substantially cheaper than the $400,000 JASSM. Rumors about a Skunk Works project involving a cruise-missile-like UCAV had been circulating for a year or two before the announcement. There were also very vague and unconfirmed rumors that the Minion was used in an operational evaluation during the invasion of Iraq in the spring of 2003.

Other designs 
Somewhat more visibly, in the summer of 2004, the Air Force, in need of a less expensive short-term UCAV solution with a focus on endurance, opened up a competition for a "Hunter-Killer" UCAV. Specifications include:

 An operating altitude of 10.7 to 15.25 kilometers (35,000 to 50,000 ft).
 Fit of SAR/MTI or EO/IR sensors and laser target designator. Of course, the Hunter-Killer would be capable of performing surveillance or reconnaissance missions along with its active combat role.

Cost specifications were given as US$10 million per aircraft and $30 million per "system", with each system including two aircraft and the necessary support gear. The Hunter-Killer program has attracted considerable interest and a number of interesting proposals.

Northrop Grumman has come up with two concepts. The first is the "Model 395", a militarized version of the Scaled Composites Proteus modified to a pure UAV configuration, with a sensor turret under the nose and a SAR-MTI pod under the forward fuselage, and carrying munitions on the centerline, for example tandem triple racks to carry six  munitions. With reduced fuel, it could even carry a single  bunker buster.

It would be powered by a single Pratt & Whitney 545 bizjet turbofan.

General Atomics offered the turboprop-powered Predator B for the role. Aurora Flight Sciences and Israel Aircraft Industries are offering an armed Heron II. Lockheed Martin has responded to the Air Force request but has been keeping quiet about their proposals. Boeing did not submit a proposal, stating the company was busy with other UCAV work.

Raytheon proposed a sixth option, whereby they would offer a combination of sensors, communications systems, and other mission-related systems as a package, and then choose an airframe at a later date. Raytheon's perspective was that, as long as it performs to a minimum set of specifications, the individual airframe is less important than the systems it will carry.

The Air Force wanted to field the Hunter-Killer by 2007 and may order up to 60 machines. The program seems focused to avoid "gold plate", and most of the avionics will likely be off-the-shelf.

References

 "New Concepts Have Emerged for USAF Unmanned Hunter-Killer Aircraft." Aviation Week & Space Technology. September 19, 2004.

Unmanned military aircraft of the United States